113 Battalion was a motorised infantry unit of the South African Army.

History

Origin of the black battalions
By the late 1970s the South African government had abandoned its opposition to arming black soldiers.

In early 1979, the government approved a plan to form a number of regional African battalions, each with a particular ethnic identity, which would serve in their homeland or under regional SADF commands.

Development of the Gazankulu Defence Force
This led to the formation of 113 Battalion for the Tsongas tribe. It is believed that the original intention was for this battalion to form the basis of a future Gazankulu Defence Force.

113 Battalion was raised in 1980 at Phalaborwa in the then Eastern Transvaal.
Troops for 113 SA Battalion were recruited from the self-governing territory of Gazankulu.

Higher Command
113 Battalion resorted under the command of Group 13.
64 soldiers from 113 Battalion was transferred to 116 Battalion when that unit was expanded.

Disbandment
113 Battalion was later absorbed into 7 South African Infantry Battalion to form a single battalion in the new SANDF.

Insignia

Leadership

Notes

Peled, A. A question of Loyalty Military Manpower Policy in Multiethinic States, Cornell University Press, 1998,  Chapter 2: South Africa: From Exclusion to Inclusion

References

Infantry battalions of South Africa
Military units and formations of South Africa in the Border War
Military units and formations established in 1980
Military units and formations disestablished in 1994